Teaticket  is a census-designated place (CDP) in the town of Falmouth, Massachusetts. The population was 1,692 at the 2010 census.

Geography
Teaticket is located in the southern part of the town of Falmouth at  (41.557934, -70.586815), between the villages of East Falmouth (to the east) and Falmouth (to the west). Massachusetts Route 28 runs east–west through the center of the village. South of 28, the CDP occupies a neck, bordered by Great Pond to the east and Little Pond to the west, that extends to Vineyard Sound. The neck is home to the Maravista neighborhood.

Demographics

As of the census of 2000, there were 1,907 people, 908 households, and 550 families residing in Teaticket. The population density was 701.2/km (1,813.6/mi). There were 1,558 housing units at an average density of 572.9/km (1,481.7/mi). The racial makeup of the CDP was 94.23% White, 1.00% African American, 0.37% Native American, 1.36% Asian, 1.36% from other races, and 1.68% from two or more races. Hispanic or Latino of any race were 1.21% of the population.

There were 908 households, out of which 15.4% had children under the age of 18 living with them, 48.0% were married couples living together, 9.9% had a female householder with no husband present, and 39.4% were non-families. 34.4% of all households were made up of individuals, and 18.8% had someone living alone who was 65 years of age or older. The average household size was 2.07 and the average family size was 2.63.

In the CDP, the population was spread out, with 16.2% under the age of 18, 4.4% from 18 to 24, 19.7% from 25 to 44, 28.7% from 45 to 64, and 31.0% who were 65 years of age or older. The median age was 53 years. For every 100 females, there were 77.6 males. For every 100 females age 18 and over, there were 77.7 males.

The median income for a household in the CDP was $41,272, and the median income for a family was $46,705. Males had a median income of $37,107 versus $25,642 for females. The per capita income for the CDP was $24,008. About 3.5% of families and 5.0% of the population were below the poverty line, including 5.8% of those under age 18 and 4.8% of those age 65 or over.

References

Census-designated places in Barnstable County, Massachusetts
Falmouth, Massachusetts
Census-designated places in Massachusetts
Populated coastal places in Massachusetts